Manithan is a 1953 Indian Tamil-language drama film directed by K. Ramnoth. The film stars T. K. Shanmugam, T. K. Bhagavathi and Krishnakumari. It is based on the play Manushyan by Muthukulam Raghavan Pillai. The film was released on 13 April 1987.

Plot 
A young wife lives with her husbands joint family. Her husband is a doctor serving in the army and he is away from home. The family gives accommodation to an artist in their house. The artist seduces the young wife and she becomes pregnant. He is chased out of the home and he goes to Bombay. He becomes involved in a car accident. The young wife's husband, the army doctor, is the driver of the car. He takes the artist to a hospital. The artist tells his story to the doctor without knowing that the same doctor is the husband of the woman he molested. The doctor discovers the truth. What happens afterwards forms the rest of the story.

Cast 
List adapted from the database of Film News Anandan and from the Hindu review article.

Male cast
T. K. Shanmugam
T. K. Bhagavathi
S. A. Natarajan
C. V. V. Panthulu
M. S. Karuppaiah
K. Ramasami

Female cast
Krishnakumari
Madhuri Devi
Pandari Bai
Dance
Ragini
Kumari Kamala

Production 
Manithan is based on the Malayalam play Manushyan by Muthukulam Raghavan Pillai. When it was staged in Tamil by the TKS Brothers, the title was changed to Manithan. The film adaptation was produced as a joint venture by Jupiter Pictures and Lavanya Movies owned by S. K. Sundararama Iyer and was directed by K. Ramnoth. Art direction was by A. K. Sekar. The film was shot at Neptune Studios that was leased by Jupiter Pictures.

Soundtrack 
Music was composed by S. V. Venkatraman while the lyrics were penned by Kanagasurabhi.

Reception 
The Hindu wrote, "The film keeps close to the stage version ... The changes makes are in consonance with the demands of the screen and are a demonstration of how film adaptation[s] should be made." The film did not fare well at the box office. However, it is remembered for the performance by Shanmugam, Bhagavathi and Krishnakumari and also for the skillful direction of Ramnoth.

References

Bibliography

External links 

1953 drama films
Films directed by K. Ramnoth
Indian black-and-white films
Indian drama films
Indian films based on plays
Jupiter Pictures films